This is a list of active and upcoming DC Comics comic books (including digital-first series) and includes imprints such as DC Black Label. The list is updated as of March 1, 2023.

Ongoing series

Active

Upcoming

Limited series

Active

Upcoming

See also
List of current Marvel Comics publications

References

External links
DC Comics

DC Comics

DC Comics-related lists